Marijan Marjanović (1904 – 6 March 1983) was a Croatian footballer. He competed in the men's tournament at the 1924 Summer Olympics.

International career
Marjanović made his debut for Yugoslavia in a May 1924 Olympic Games match against Uruguay and earned a total of 6 caps, scoring no goals. His final international was an October 1926 King Alexander's Cup match against Romania.

References

External links

1904 births
1983 deaths
Place of birth missing
Association football defenders
Yugoslav footballers
Yugoslavia international footballers
Olympic footballers of Yugoslavia
Footballers at the 1924 Summer Olympics
HAŠK players